Magnolia High School (MHS) is one of two public high schools in the Magnolia Independent School District in Magnolia, Texas, United States. 
  
For 2018–19, the school received a score of 89 out of 100 from the Texas Education Agency.

Demographics
In the 2018–2019 school year, there were 2,005 students enrolled at Magnolia High School. The ethnic distribution of students was as follows: 
 3.1% African American
 1.6% Asian
 27.2% Hispanic
 0.2% American Indian
 65.4% White
 2.4% Two or More Races

27.9% of students were eligible for free or reduced-price lunch.

Academics
For each school year, the Texas Education Agency rates school performance using an A–F grading system based on statistical data. For 2018–2019, the school received a score of 89 out of 100, resulting in a B grade. The school received the same score the previous year.

Athletics
Magnolia High School offers a number of athletic programs, including Cross Country, Football, Team Tennis, Golf, Volleyball, Basketball, Soccer, Powerlifting, Swimming & Diving, Baseball, Track, Marching Band, and Softball.

Notable alumni
Buddy Dial - former Pittsburgh Steelers wide receiver and College Football Hall of Fame inductee
Jordan Groshans - professional baseball player
Adam Kloffenstein - professional baseball player

References

High schools in Montgomery County, Texas
Public high schools in Texas
Educational institutions established in 1912
1912 establishments in Texas